Antonio "Tony" Chua (1965-September 26, 2009) was a Filipino Chinese businessman. His family owns Photokina Marketing Corporation, which distributed Red Bull in the Philippines; he managed and was the governor of the Barako Bull Energy Boosters, the company's team in the Philippine Basketball Association (PBA) in which he previously served as chairman. Chua also served as vice president of Philippine Football Federation (PFF); he previously played high school varsity football for Colegio de San Juan de Letran.

Early life and career
Chua studied in Colegio de San Juan de Letran up to college, graduating in 1975. He played for the Letran Squires football team and was known as "Mr. Football." Chua coached the Philippine women's national football team, and later served as vice president of the PFF.

Basketball manager
Chua's company Photokina Marketing Corporation fielded the Red Bull to the semiprofessional Philippine Basketball League (PBL), and he was tasked to manage the team. Then PBL commissioner Yeng Guiao allowed the team to compete, and the team won several championships.

When the Photokina franchise entered the professional Philippine Basketball Association (PBA) as Batang Red Bull, Chua appointed Guiao as the coach of the team. Guiao led the Red Bull team to three championships: the 2001 and 2002 Commissioner's Cups, and the 2006 Fiesta Conference.

After Noli Eala resigned as PBA commissioner, Chua as chairman of the board of governors ran the daily affairs of the league while a replacement was being found. When Sonny Barrios was appointed as interim commissioner, Chua personally welcomed Barrios on his first day on the job.

After the 2008–09 Philippine Cup, Guiao resigned and the team was renamed as the Barako Bull Energy Boosters. Guiao was later signed as head coach of the Burger King Whoppers but the two remained close.

Among his projects in the PBA is the PBA Hall of Fame; he was one of the selectors for the third batch which were announced in 2009.

Death
At the height of Tropical Storm Ketsana (Ondoy), traffic was not moving and he and his driver and Barako Bull liaison officer aides alighted their car. The three trekked the flooded road when a strong current engulfed them, sucking away the driver; Chua can only look at his aide as his body faded out of sight. The two decided to stop and hold on to a tree when a truck carrying lumber passed by, the lumber that jutted out of the truck hit Chua in the face. The details right after he was hit by the lumber weren't clear; he could have died because of hypothermia or from internal hemorrhage, for he was bleeding from the ears. His liaison officer caught up with him and tried to revive him, but he died on the way. The driver's body was fished out of the waters two days after the storm.

Reaction
Sports officials were saddened by Chua's demise. Guiao was "deeply shocked" and remarked that Chua was "well liked by everyone in the basketball community". Guiao's successor as commissioner in the PBL Chino Trinidad said described Chua as "a funny guy" but "passionate in the game". PBA commissioner Barrios, who announced Chua's death to the press, was personally affected by Chua's death, saying that we always "worked well" with him.

References

2009 deaths
Colegio de San Juan de Letran alumni
Deaths in tropical cyclones
Natural disaster deaths in the Philippines
Philippine Basketball Association executives
National Collegiate Athletic Association (Philippines) players
20th-century Filipino businesspeople
1965 births